Bernard Blaut (3 January 1940 – 19 May 2007) was a Polish football player, who is most famous for his 1960s performances in both Legia Warsaw and the Polish National Team.

Between 1960 and 1971 he was capped 36 times for Poland, scoring three goals. In 1972, he moved to France, where he played for FC Metz till 1974.

He died on 19 May 2007 in Warszawa.

References

External links

1940 births
2007 deaths
Polish footballers
Poland international footballers
Odra Opole players
Legia Warsaw players
FC Metz players
Ligue 1 players
Expatriate footballers in France
Polish football managers
Expatriate football managers in the United Arab Emirates
United Arab Emirates national football team managers
People from Krapkowice
Sportspeople from Opole Voivodeship
Association football midfielders
Polish expatriate football managers